Farage is a surname. It has also been used as an anglicised form of the Arabic surname Faraj. Notable people with the surname include:

 Nigel Farage (born 1964), British politician
 Anthony Farage, also spelt Faraj (1885–1963), Syrian Melkite Greek Catholic bishop

See also
 Faragism, an ideology and practice associated with the followers and supporters of Nigel Farage
 Farag (surname)
 Faraj, an Arabic given name

Surnames of French origin